Seweryn Kiełpin (born 18 December 1987) is a Polish professional footballer who plays as a goalkeeper.

Career

Club

As a youth player, Kiełpin joined the youth academy of Górnik Zabrze.

In the summer 2010, he was loaned to Ruch Radzionków from Polonia Bytom (second time).
In December 2010, he returned to Polonia and then joined Ruch Radzionków again in January 2012, signing a deal on a free transfer.

References

External links
 
 

1987 births
Living people
Polish footballers
Górnik Zabrze players
Polonia Bytom players
Ruch Radzionków players
Wisła Płock players
Stal Mielec players
Motor Lublin players
Ekstraklasa players
I liga players
II liga players
People from Kościerzyna
Sportspeople from Pomeranian Voivodeship
Association football goalkeepers